Cardiovirus B is a species in the genus Cardiovirus and is represented by two isolates, Saffold virus (SAFV) and Theiler's murine encephalomyelitis virus (TMEV).

References

Cardioviruses